Andrea Berntzen (born 1998)  is a Norwegian actress and student.

As a student at her secondary school in Oslo, she participated as an actress in a school revue in 2017. She was awarded as the actress of the year in a competition between the year's school revues of Oslo.

After graduation, she was offered the lead role as the main character Kaja in the drama film Utøya: July 22, shot entirely in a single long-take. Her efforts in the role in the movie received praise at the Berlin Film Festival 2018 from Norwegian and international media. She received later the Norwegian Amanda Award 2018 for the best actress for this role. In the autumn of 2017 she started her education as an actress.
In 2021, she played the role of Pia, in the Netflix web series The Girl from Oslo (TV series).

References

External links 
  

1998 births
Living people
Norwegian stage actresses
Norwegian film actresses
21st-century Norwegian actresses